Leonard Kyle Carson (March 12, 1923 – March 8, 1994) was a fighter ace and a colonel in the United States Air Force.

References

External links

1923 births
1994 deaths
American World War II flying aces
Recipients of the Distinguished Flying Cross (United States)
Recipients of the Silver Star
United States Air Force colonels
United States Army Air Forces pilots of World War II